Italy at the European Cross Country Championships participated at all editions of the European Cross Country Championships from Alnwick 1994.

Medals
Andrea Lalli won the competition in all three categories: senior, under 23 and under 20 (previously named junior).

Senior

Individual

Team

Under 23
Italy at under 23 level won 2 gold medals, 3 silver and 6 bronze.

Under 20
Italy at junior (under 20 from 2018) level won 7 gold medals, 4 silver and 4 bronze.

See also
 Italy national athletics team
 Italian team at the running events

Notes

References

External links
 European Athletic Association

 
Athletics in Italy
Nations at the European Cross Country Championships
Italy national athletics team